Gérson Cândido de Paula (born 1 June 1967 in São Paulo, Brazil), known as Gérson Caçapa, is a Brazilian former footballer, who played as a midfielder, usually as an attacking midfielder.

Gérson Caçapa played for Sociedade Esportiva Palmeiras and Clube Atlético Paranaense in the Campeonato Brasileiro. and played for A.S. Bari in Italy for Serie A and U.S. Lecce for Serie B. He also had a spell with Fenerbahçe S.K. and Istanbulspor in the Turkish Super Lig.

Honours
 Palmeiras
Taça dos Invictos: 1989
 A.S. Bari
Mitropa Cup: 1990
 Fenerbahçe
Chancellor Cup: 1992–93
 Atlético Paranaense
Campeonato Paranaense: 1998
Parana Cup: 1998

References

1967 births
Living people
Brazilian footballers
Association football midfielders
Sociedade Esportiva Palmeiras players
Club Athletico Paranaense players
Brazilian expatriate footballers
S.S.C. Bari players
U.S. Lecce players
Serie A players
Expatriate footballers in Italy
Fenerbahçe S.K. footballers
İstanbulspor footballers
Süper Lig players
Brazilian expatriate sportspeople in Turkey
Expatriate footballers in Turkey
Footballers from São Paulo